The Black Pearl is a 2012 Polish non-fiction book written by Madlen Namro.

Plot
This collection of three stories under a joint name The Black Pearl is based on author's notes from traveling around Italy. Each of the characters met by the author tells her a moving history of his or her life. When talking to the author they experience a particular catharsis: a spiritual and emotional cleanse, they release emotions, they seem to want to tame the sometimes pointless chaos of their lives. The need to confide stems from the internal need of sorting one’s thoughts. Each of us needs understanding and affection. All of these stories are naturally brought to order by life which puts them into a coherent wholeness.

Publications

English worldwide publications
Words: 11,818 (approximate)

Published as e-book by Atlantis Ltd.
Published as e-book by Smashwords Inc.

References

2012 non-fiction books
Polish non-fiction books
2012 short story collections
Polish short story collections